Walter Marichal (18 April 1935 – 31 July 2017) is a Uruguayan footballer. He played in three matches for the Uruguay national football team from 1957 to 1958. He was also part of Uruguay's squad for the 1957 South American Championship.

References

External links
 

1935 births
2017 deaths
Uruguayan footballers
Uruguay international footballers
Place of birth missing
Association football defenders
Club Nacional de Football players
Ferro Carril Oeste footballers
Uruguayan expatriate footballers
Expatriate footballers in Argentina